The Montgomery 7-11 is an American sailing dinghy that was designed by Lyle Hess as a daysailer.

Production
The design was built by Montgomery Marine Products in Dana Point, California, United States, but it is now out of production.

Design
The Montgomery 7-11 is a recreational sailboat, built predominantly of fiberglass, with wooden trim. It has a catboat rig with aluminum spars, a spooned plumb stem, a vertical transom, a transom-hung rudder controlled by a tiller and two retractable leeboards. It displaces .

See also
List of sailing boat types

References

External links
Montgomery 7-11 photos

Dinghies
Sailboat types built in the United States
Sailboat type designs by Lyle Hess
Sailboat types built by Montgomery Marine Products